Justice Chaudhry Muhammad Sharif (جسٹس چوہدری محمد شریف) (March 10, 1928 - June 29, 2009) was a prominent judge of the Lahore High Court in Pakistan.

Early life 
Justice Sharif was born in a village near Hoshiarpur district (East Punjab) on March 10, 1928. At the time of partition of India, he was a student in the Government College Hoshiarpur. After migrating to Pakistan, he completed his education from SE College in Bahawalpur and the University of Punjab's Law College in Lahore.

Judicial career 
After a short phase as a practicing lawyer, he started his career in judiciary as Civil Judge on March 23, 1953 by taking charge in Chakwal. Having served as the District and Session's Judge in Punjab from 1970 to 1980, he took oath as judge of the Lahore High Court on the November 2, 1981 and retired from the High Court on March 10, 1990. Due to his spotless record of dauntless honesty, he was requested by the government to rejoin as a judge of the Special Court for Speedy Trials in Multan where he served till 1994.

During his long and illustrious career as a judge, Justice Sharif dealt with thousands of cases and gave several landmark judgments. Among these, the most prominent judgment was in the high-profile murder case of the former Chief Minister Ghulam Haider Wayne during which he faced and defied tremendous pressures and made a just decision. As a professional judge, Justice Sharif was known for his extraordinary efficiency, integrity and speedy decision making. During his tenure as a judge he was five times awarded the All Punjab Certificate for giving judgment on maximum number of court cases. He set the highest standards of honesty and punctuality very few could claim.

Later years 
Justice Sharif lived a simple and disciplined life as a devoted Muslim. He was very fond of Iqbal's philosophy of self-esteem and faith. He remained an ardent swimmer, athlete and won several local tennis championships as a keen tennis player. He died on June 29, 2009  and is buried in Bahawalpur where he lived most of his later years in life. Justice Sharif was survived by his widow, two sons and two daughters. His autobiography is in final phases of being edited for publication.

References

1928 births
2009 deaths
Pakistani judges